The 2007–08 season was FC Dinamo București's 59th season in Liga I. The season found the Dinamo fans hoping for another title in Romania and a qualification in the Group Stage of the UEFA Champions League.

Champions League
Dinamo entered the competition in the third qualifying round, and faced Lazio. The two clubs contested the first leg in Rome at the Stadio Olimpico on 14 August and the second leg on 28 August on Lia Manoliu National Stadium. The first leg ended in a 1–1 draw; Ionel Danciulescu scored first with a perfect header after a cross from Cristian Pulhac, but Lazio equalised in the second-half with a header from Massimo Mutarelli. In the first-half, Bogdan Lobonț saved a penalty from Tommaso Rocchi after Ștefan Radu committed had committed a handball in the penalty area.

The second leg was played on Lia Manoliu National Stadium. The first half ended in a 1–0 lead for Dinamo thanks to a goal scored by Florin Bratu on a 30-meter sprint. Dinamo, however, conceded three goals in the second-half, caused by three defensive mistakes, the first being a penalty kick scored by Rocchi after a foul by Valentin Nastase, who left the team following the match. The game ended in a 3–1 loss for Dinamo, thus eliminating them from the Champions League. The elimination led also Mircea Rednic to resign from his head coaching position, being replaced by Walter Zenga.

UEFA Cup
Dinamo challenged Sweden champions IF Elfsborg in the UEFA Cup first round and were eliminated after a 1–2 loss at home and a 1–0 win in Borås. Dinamo's only achievable goal remained the Romanian Championship. Winning the title would have qualified it directly to next season's Champions League group stage.

Managerial changes
Walter Zenga left Dinamo after two disappointing derbies against Rapid București at home (0–2) and Steaua București away (1–0) with a poor defensive play that was opposing with the team's very strong playing offensive. After collecting zero points in these crucial games, he was replaced by Cornel Țălnar with whom Dinamo had a debut in Liga I 3–1 against UTA Arad on 1 December 2007.

On 4 March 2008, Gheorghe Multescu replaced Țălnar but he resigned after only 27 days in charge. After Multescu's resignment, Talnar was again inserted as coach until the end of the championship, having very good final matches against Rapid (2–1) and Steaua (2–1). Dinamo ultimately finished the year in fourth place, qualifying for the subsequent season's UEFA Cup.

Results

Europe

UEFA Champions League 

Third qualifying round

Lazio won 4–2 on aggregate.

UEFA Cup 

First round

Elfsborg won due to away goals.

Squad 

Goalkeepers: Bogdan Lobonț (32/0), Deniss Romanovs (2/0).

Defenders: George Blay (18/0), Zie Diabaté (1/0), Mariano Fernández (2/0), John Galliquio (8/0), Lucian Goian (18/1), Ivan Gvozdenović (2/0), Silviu Izvoranu (22/0), Cosmin Moți (23/1), Nicolae Mușat (2/0), Valentin Năstase (2/0), Nino Pekaric (3/0), Cristian Pulhac (29/0), Ștefan Radu (19/0), Adrian Scarlatache (1/0), Flavius Stoican (7/0), Blaže Todorovski (2/0).

Midfielders: Gabriel Boștină (20/0), Hristu Chiacu (10/0), Adrian Cristea (32/8), Fabrice Fernandes (2/0), Andrei Mărgăritescu (26/2), Cătălin Munteanu (30/1), Georgian Păun (2/0), Adrian Ropotan (30/0), Gabriel Torje (15/1), Vojislav Vranjković (6/0).

Forwards: Florin Bratu (26/14), Ionel Dănciulescu (32/21), Liviu Ganea (5/0), Osvaldo Miranda (11/2), Claudiu Niculescu (16/2), Daniel Oprița (5/0), Ianis Zicu (12/2).

Transfers 

New players: Valentin Năstase (Ascoli Calcio), Flavius Stoican (Shakhtar Donetsk), Silviu Izvoranu (Politehnica Timișoara), Daniel Opriţa (Steaua București), Florin Bratu (FC Nantes-Atlantique), Ianis Zicu (Internazionale Milano), Hristu Chiacu (Wisła Kraków), Gabriel Torje (Politehnica Timișoara).

Left team: Florin Matache (Ceahlăul Piatra-Neamţ), Sergiu Homei (Politehnica Iaşi), Silviu Bălace (FC Vaslui), Constantin Bumbac (FCM UTA Arad), Adrian Scarlatache (Pandurii Târgu-Jiu), Lucian Goian (Ceahlăul Piatra-Neamţ), Vojislav Vranjković -Serbia- (Ceahlăul Piatra-Neamţ), Zé Kalanga -Angola- (FC Boavista Porto), Cornel Predescu (Dacia Mioveni), Alexandru Bălţoi (FCM UTA Arad), Jean Philip Mendy -France- (Petrolul Ploieşti), Valentin Năstase (free player, round 6), Fabrice Fernandes (free player, round 4)

References

External links 
 www.labtof.ro
 www.romaniansoccer.ro

FC Dinamo București seasons
Dinamo Bucuresti